Cosmosoma hypocheilus is a moth of the family Erebidae. It was described by George Hampson in 1898. It is found on St. Vincent, an island in the Caribbean Sea.

References

hypocheilus
Moths described in 1898